Mohamed Farhad (18 sep 1999) is a Maldivian singer.

Early life and career
Farhad was born on 25 June 1982 in Th. Madifushi. Since childhood, he was exposed to music of several genres which leads him to perform in the stage shows held in some of the occasions. In 2005, he performed the track "Jahanvaane Athaa Athaa" for the album Yaahabeys (2005) which was ultimately included in Mohamed Abdulla's comedy short film series, Falhi Sikunthu 2 (2005). He then collaborated with Abdulla for several other projects including the Farihibe series. In 2009, he auditioned for a local television singing show, Maldivian Icon where he got selected as the second runner-up of the competition, which resulted in him further expanding his career as a singer with several offers from music directors and producers. The same year, he recorded his first song in a feature film, the romantic track "Loabin Thi Hiyy Hiba Kohfinama" from the film Udhabaani (2009) followed by the groovy dance track "Fenifaa Zuvaan" from the film Baaraige Fas (2009). He next contributed to the soundtrack album of the films Veeraana (2010), Hithey Dheymee (2011) and Hiyy Yaara Dheefa (2011). Some of his notable songs include, "Kalaa Keehvehey Vakivee Yaaraa" from Vakivi Hin'dhu (2006), "Loabivaa Thihan'dhaan" from I Love You (2010), "Dhaiygoani Ossaalaaneyoa" from Santhi Mariyan'bu 3 (2010) and "Ekugaa Loabin Yaaru Ulhefaa" from Jaanaa (2013).

Discography

Feature film

Short film

Television

Non-Film songs

Filmography

Accolades

References 

Living people
People from Malé
1982 births
Maldivian playback singers